The Montgomeryshire Football League (currently the JT Hughes Football League) is a football league in Mid Wales, sitting at the fifth level of the Welsh football league system.

The league hosts several cup competitions. These include: The Emrys Morgan Cup, Montgomeryshire Cup, Village Cup, Tanners Town Cup, League Cup and Consolation Cup.

Teams promoted from Division One may enter the Mid Wales League if standards and facilities fall into line with the regulations and criteria of the FAW and Mid Wales Football League (Tier 4 of the Welsh Football Pyramid).

History
The league was founded in 1904 as the Montgomeryshire & District League, and the first ten seasons before the First World War saw the league dominated by Aberystwyth Town, who won the inaugural title and two other championships, and Llanidloes who won five titles.

After the war, the league was reformed for a single season with Newtown picking up their only title (to date), before the league went into abeyance with the creation of the Welsh National League setup.  The league returned in the 1930s as the Montgomery Junior League and ran until the outbreak of the Second World War, when football was again suspended.

The 1950s were notable for five successive titles for Rodney Rovers, a club from Four Crosses, who played behind the Golden Lion public house.

The 1967–68 saw the league expand to two divisions, a format that continued until the 2021–22 season.

It has also been known as the Montgomeryshire Amateur League.

Member clubs for 2022–23 season

Division One

Abermule reserves
Churchstoke
Four Crosses reserves
Llanfechain
Llanfyllin Town reserves
Llangedwyn  
Trefonen
Waterloo Rovers reserves

Champions

Two division structure

One division structure
Those years empty are not known.

2021–22: – Meifod
1968–69: – Llansantffraid
1967–68: –
1966–67: – Carno
1965–66: – Llanrhaeadr
1964–65: – Forden United
1963–64: – Newtown Amateurs
1962–63: – Forden United
1961–62: – Trewern United
1960–61: – Berriew
1959–60: – Montgomery Town
1958–59: – Montgomery Town
1957–58: – Rodney Rovers
1956–57: – Rodney Rovers
1955–56: – Rodney Rovers
1954–55: – Rodney Rovers
1953–54: – Rodney Rovers
1952–53: – Montgomery Town
1951–52: – Llanfechain
1950–51: – Llanfechain
1949–50: – Llandrinio
1948–49: – Llandrinio
1947–48: – Llanfair United
1946–47: – Llanfair United
1945–46: – Football suspended - World War Two
1944–45: – Football suspended - World War Two
1943–44: – Football suspended - World War Two
1942–43: – Football suspended - World War Two
1941–42: – Football suspended - World War Two
1940–41: – Football suspended - World War Two
1939–40: – Football suspended - World War Two
1938–39: – Caersws
1937–38: – Caersws
1936–37: – Guilsfield
1935–36: – 
1934–35: –  Newtown C C
1920–21: – League went into abeyance with the creation of the Welsh National League setup (started again in 1930s, but unclear which season)
1919–20: – Newtown
1918–19: – Football suspended - World War One
1917–18: – Football suspended - World War One
1916–17: – Football suspended - World War One
1915–16: – Football suspended - World War One
1914–15: – Football suspended - World War One
1913–14: – Llanidloes
1912–13: – Llanidloes
1911–12: – Llanidloes
1910–11: – Llanfyllin
1909–10: – Llanidloes
1908–09: – Llanidloes
1907–08: – Aberystwyth Town
1906–07: – Aberystwyth Town
1905–06: – Newtown North End
1904–05: – Aberystwyth Town

Titles by team

Llanfair United/ Llanfair Caereinion/ reserves – 10 titles
Llansantffraid/ TNS / reserves – 8 titles
Llanidloes – 6 titles
Llanfyllin – 5 titles
Rodney Rovers – 5 titles
Caersws/ Caersws reserves – 4 titles
Aberystwyth Town – 3 titles
Berriew – 3 titles
Bettws (Cedewain) – 3 titles
Guilsfield/ Guilsfield reserves  – 3 titles
Llanfechain – 3 titles
Montgomery Town – 3 titles
Waterloo Rovers –3 titles
Bishop's Castle Town – 2 titles
Forden United – 2 titles
Llandrinio – 2 titles
Llangedwyn – 2 titles
Meifod – 2 titles
Carno –1 title
Dyffryn Banw – 1 title
Four Crosses – 1 title
Kerry – 1 title
Llansantffraid Village – 1 title
Llanrhaeadr – 1 title
Llanwddyn – 1 title
Mochdre – 1 title
Newtown - 1 title
Newtown Amateurs – 1 title
Newtown C C – 1 title
Newtown North End – 1 title
Trewern United – 1 title
Welshpool Rangers – 1 title
Welshpool Town reserves – 1 title

See also
Football in Wales
List of football clubs in Wales

External links
Official league website

References

5
Montgomeryshire
Wales
1904 establishments in Wales
Sports leagues established in 1904